Braune is a German surname. Notable people with the surname include:

Christian Wilhelm Braune (1831–1892), German anatomist
Werner Braune (1909–1951), German Nazi SS officer, executed for war crimes
Wilhelm Braune (1850–1926), German philologist and Germanist

See also
Braun (disambiguation)

German-language surnames